Nhân Tông is the temple name used for several emperors of Vietnam, derived from the Chinese equivalent Rénzōng. It may refer to:

Lý Nhân Tông (1066–1127, reigned 1072–1127), emperor of the Lý dynasty
Trần Nhân Tông (1258–1308, reigned 1278–1293), emperor of the Trần dynasty
Lê Nhân Tông (1441–1459, reigned 1453–1459), emperor of the Lê dynasty

See also
Renzong (disambiguation), Chinese equivalent
Injong (disambiguation), Korean equivalent

Temple name disambiguation pages